Kevin J. McCabe (born 1958 or 1959) is an American Republican politician from Alaska. He has represented District 8 as a Member of the Alaska House of Representatives since 2021.

Early life 
McCabe was born in  Hibbing, Minnesota.

References

1950s births
21st-century American politicians
Living people
Republican Party members of the Alaska House of Representatives
People from Hibbing, Minnesota
People from Matanuska-Susitna Borough, Alaska
Year of birth missing (living people)